The State Counsellor (the 5th civil grade in the Table of Ranks of Imperial Russia) is the sixth novel in the Erast Fandorin  historical detective series by Boris Akunin. It is subtitled "political detective mystery".  The State Counsellor was originally published in Russia in 2000.  The English translation was published in January 2008.

Plot
Moscow, 1891. Disguised as Fandorin, the leader of a revolutionary organization murders a general. Fandorin has to catch him. He is assisted (or is it hindered?) in his investigations by Prince Pozharsky, a fictional descendant of Dmitry Pozharsky, who helped bring the Time of Troubles to an end.

Film, TV or theatrical adaptations

In 2005, The State Counsellor was turned into a film starring Oleg Menshikov as Fandorin and Nikita Mikhalkov as Prince Pozharsky.  The two-hour theatrical release was then expanded into a 3 hour version which was shown on Russian television. It was one of the most expensive Russian films ever made.

References

External links
 Full text of the novel, in Russian
 Official website of the film (Russian)
 The State Counsellor at the IMDb
 Collection of stills from the film
 Russian article on the film, with stills
 English-language review of the film, from Variety
 Movie Trailer and Screenshots
 List of characters for the reader

2000 novels
Novels by Boris Akunin
Novels set in Moscow
Fiction set in 1891
Novels set in the 1890s
Historical mystery novels
Weidenfeld & Nicolson books
Russian novels adapted into films
20th-century Russian novels
Russian historical novels
Russian detective novels
Russian political novels